Local elections were be held in Mexico on 5 June 2022. Six states held gubernatorial elections, along with local deputy elections in Quintana Roo and municipal elections in Durango.

Gubernatorial elections

Aguascalientes 
Governor of Aguascalientes – incumbent Martín Orozco Sandoval
 Anayeli Muñoz Moreno, former senator
 Nora Ruvalcaba Gámez, former state Development Coordinator and former state deputy
 Natzielly Teresita Rodríguez Calzada
 María Teresa Jiménez Esquivel, deputy for the 2nd district
 Martha Márquez Alvarado, senator and former state deputy

Durango 
Governor of Durango – incumbent José Rosas Aispuro
 Patricia Flores Elizondo, former Chief of Staff to President Felipe Calderón
 Esteban Villegas Villarreal, former Mayor of Durango City and former state deputy
 Alma Marina Vitela, former Mayor of Gómez Palacio

Hidalgo 
Governor of Hidalgo – incumbent Omar Fayad
 José Luis Lima Morales
 Francisco Xavier Berganza, former senator and former deputy
 Carolina Viggiano, deputy
 Julio Menchaca, former senator and former deputy

Oaxaca 
Governor of Oaxaca – incumbent Alejandro Murat Hinojosa
 Antonia Nativiad Díaz Jiménez
 Dulce Alejandra García Morlan
 Bersahin Asael López López
 Mauricio Cruz Vargas (Independent), former Mayor of Abejones and indigenous activist
 Jesús López Rodríguez (Independent)
 Alejandro Avilés Álvarez
 Salomón Jara Cruz, former senator

Quintana Roo 

Governor of Quintana Roo – incumbent Carlos Joaquín González
 Leslie Hendricks Rubio, state deputy
 José Luis Pech Várguez, senator
 Nivardo Mena Villanueva (MAS), former Mayor of Lázaro Cárdenas
 Laura Fernández Piña, deputy
 Mara Lezama Espinosa, former Mayor of Benito Juárez

Tamaulipas 
Governor of Tamaulipas – incumbent Francisco Javier García Cabeza de Vaca
 Arturo Díez Gutiérrez
 César Augusto Verástegui Ostos, former deputy
 Américo Villarreal Anaya, former senator

Local Deputies elections

References 

2022 elections in Mexico
Elections in Mexico
Gubernatorial elections in Mexico
Elections in Mexico by state
Politics of Mexico